George Francis Kane (born August 11, 1948) is an American chess FIDE Master (FM) and writer.

Biography
In 1972, George Francis Kane won the Manhattan Chess Club Championship. In 1973, he debuted in the U.S. Chess Championship, sharing 12th and 13th place with Donald Byrne.

George Francis Kane played for the United States in the Chess Olympiad:
 in 1972, at the second reserve board in the 20th Chess Olympiad in Skopje (+2, =5, −5).

In 1974, George Francis Kane published a book for chess beginners, What's the Next Move?: A Book of Chess Tactics for Children and Other Beginners, which was the first book for children with algebraic chess notation in the United States. In 1976, he and co-author Pierre R. Schwob published another book, The Chess Tutor, Opening Moves.

George Francis Kane was active in Minnesota Atheists – the largest atheist organization in the state of Minnesota. He was secretary (1998–2005), chair (2005–2007), and president (since 2007) of the organization.

References

External links

George Francis Kane chess games at 365chess.com

1948 births
Living people
Sportspeople from Palo Alto, California
Chess FIDE Masters
American chess players
American chess writers
Chess Olympiad competitors